°

Sneathiella chinensis is a Gram-negative, aerobic, non-spore-forming, chemoheterotrophic, halotolerant and motile bacterium from the genus of Sneathiella which has been isolated from coastal sediments from Qingdao in China.

References

External links
Type strain of Sneathiella chinensis at BacDive -  the Bacterial Diversity Metadatabase

Alphaproteobacteria
Bacteria described in 2007